Don't Tell is a May 2017 Australian drama film directed by Tori Garrett and starring Jack Thompson, Aden Young and Sara West.  It was based on the 2017 novel of the same name by solicitor Stephen Roche.

The basis of the film has been paralleled with the film Spotlight, based on the Boston systematic child sexual abuse by a religious institution.  The Missy Higgins song "Torchlight" was composed for the film.

Plot synopsis
Don't Tell is based on the true story of Lyndal, a young woman who had been sexually abused at a prestigious private school and, with the help of a determined lawyer, sued the powerful church that denied her abuse for ten years.

Cast
 Jack Thompson as Bob Myers, trial counsel
 Sara West as Lyndal, victim
 Aden Young as Stephen Roche, solicitor
 Rachel Griffiths as Joy Conolly, psychologist 
 Jacqueline McKenzie as Jean Dalton, counsellor 
 Susie Porter as Sue, mother of Lyndal
 Gyton Grantley as Kevin Guy, offender
 Robert Coleby as John Bowers
 Martin Sacks as Tony, father of Lyndal
 Robert Taylor as Robert Brewster, school council chairman

Background 
A school boardermaster of a Toowoomba private school was criminally charged in November 1990 with sexual offences involving children.  He committed suicide on the day of a court appearance.  In the subsequent 2001 civil court case S v Corporation of the Synod of the Diocese of Brisbane [2001] QSC 473, the offending behaviours were accepted by the defendant, and a suicide note not tended, which included the name of the subject victim of this movie.  A jury found for the plaintiff.

The civil case was considered to be an important step leading to the 2013–2017 Australian Royal Commission into Institutional Responses to Child Sexual Abuse.  The case also led to the development of the working with children checks government policy across Australia.

Locations 
The events centre around the Toowoomba Preparatory School (now known as the Toowoomba Anglican School) with filming around Toowoomba.  Some shooting occurred around the Ipswich area, with the historic schoolhouse facade being the National Trust-listed 1888 'Woodlands' at Marburg.  Scenes from Picnic Point, Toowoomba were also used.

Reception
Don't Tell was met with positive reviews from critics. On Rotten Tomatoes it has an approval rating of 80% based on reviews from 10 critics.

Accolades

See also
 Spotlight
 Oranges and Sunshine

References

External links
 Don't Tell on Internet Movie Database
 Don't Tell on Rotten Tomatoes

2017 films
Australian drama films
2017 drama films
Films set in Queensland
Films shot in Queensland
2010s English-language films
2010s Australian films